Hesperostipa comata, commonly known as needle-and-thread grass, is a species of grass native to North America, especially the western third. It has a wide distribution spanning from northern Canada to Mexico.

Description

The seeds of this grass have hygroscopic extensions that bend with changes in humidity, enabling them to disperse over the ground.  Each seed has an awn that twists several turns when the seed is released. Increased moisture causes it to untwist, and, upon drying, to twist again, thus the seed is drilled into the ground.

Habitat
This is a grass of many habitat types, from grassland to pine forest. Young shoots provide a favored food source for black-tailed prairie dogs and black-tailed jackrabbits, and the grass is a good early spring graze for livestock before it develops its long, sharp awn.

Cultural
This species was described by the explorers during the Lewis and Clark Expedition.

Needle and thread grass is the provincial grass of the prairie province of Saskatchewan.

This species is popular among children because of the seed's ability to be thrown and stick to clothing.

References

External links
 Jepson Manual Treatment - Hesperostipa comata
 

Pooideae
Bunchgrasses of North America
Native grasses of the Great Plains region
Native grasses of California
Native grasses of Nebraska
Native grasses of Oklahoma
Native grasses of Texas
Grasses of the United States
Grasses of Canada
Grasses of Mexico
Flora of Northwestern Mexico
Flora of the Western United States
Flora of the Sierra Nevada (United States)
Flora of the Great Lakes region (North America)
Flora of Saskatchewan
Natural history of the California chaparral and woodlands
Provincial symbols of Saskatchewan
Fiber plants
Flora without expected TNC conservation status